Die Alpenklinik (The Alpine Clinic) is a German romantic drama television series aired since 2005. It follows the activities of the successful Berlin heart surgeon Dr. Daniel Guth in the Salzburg area.

See also
List of German television series

External links
 

German medical television series
German drama television series
2006 German television series debuts
2011 German television series endings
Television shows set in Austria
German-language television shows
Das Erste original programming